Hearts on Fire may refer to:

Albums
 Hearts on Fire (Baker Gurvitz Army album), or the title song, 1976
 Hearts on Fire (Colin James album), or the title song, 2015
 Hearts on Fire (Noel Pagan album), or the title song, 1993
 Hearts on Fire (EP), or the title song (see below), by Chad Brownlee, 2016
 Hearts on Fire, by Jetty Road, 2015
 Hearts on Fire, by Patsy Watchorn, 2003

Songs
 "Hearts on Fire" (Bryan Adams song), 1987
 "Hearts on Fire" (Chad Brownlee song), 2015
 "Hearts on Fire" (The Common Linnets song), 2015
 "Hearts on Fire" (Cut Copy song), 2008
 "Hearts on Fire" (Eddie Rabbitt song), 1978
 "Hearts on Fire" (HammerFall song), 2002
 "Hearts on Fire" (Illenium, Dabin and Lights song), 2020
 "Hearts on Fire" (Steve Winwood song), 1988
 "Heart's on Fire" (John Cafferty song), 1986
 "Heart's on Fire" (Passenger song), 2014
 "Hearts on Fire", by Genesis, B-side of the single "Jesus He Knows Me"
 "Hearts on Fire", by Randy Meisner from One More Song
 "Hearts on Fire", by Walter Egan

Companies
 Hearts on Fire (company), an American diamond manufacturer and jewellery design company

See also
 Heart on Fire (disambiguation)
 Hearts Aflame (disambiguation)
 Hearts Afire, an American sitcom